Saint-Didier-d'Allier (literally Saint-Didier of Allier; Auvergnat: Sant Desdèir d'Alèir) is a former commune in the Haute-Loire department in south-central France. On 1 January 2017, it was merged into the commune Saint-Privat-d'Allier. Its population was 45 in 2019.

See also
Communes of the Haute-Loire department

References

Saintdidierdallier
Populated places disestablished in 2017